Late Night Cinema is a studio album by American hip hop production duo Blue Sky Black Death. It was released by Babygrande Records in 2008.

Critical reception
Alan Ranta of PopMatters gave the album 8 stars out of 10, describing it as "a thorough triumph from two of hip-hop's most exciting prospects." Meanwhile, Zoneil Maharaj of XLR8R gave the album a 9 out of 10, calling it "a dark yet beautiful soundscape with heavy classical overtones and lush drops that commands listeners' attention, navigating us through various moods."

Quentin B. Huff of PopMatters named it the 2nd best instrumental hip hop album of 2008.

Track listing

Personnel
Credits adapted from liner notes.

 Blue Sky Black Death – instrumentation
 C.T. Thompson – vocals (1, 7, 9, 10)
 Ashley Wise – vocals (3, 8)
 Yes Alexander – vocals (5)
 Valerie Coon – violin (1, 3, 5, 10)
 Nancey Kuo – violin (3, 4, 5, 8)
 Tony Rogers – trumpet (3, 4, 6, 8)
 Evan Gordon – organ (3, 4, 6, 7, 8), synthesizer (3, 4, 6, 7, 8)
 Mark Christensen – mastering
 Michael Tabie – photo collage, design
 Debbie Carlos – original background photography
 Jesse Stone – marketing
 Willy Friedman – product management

References

External links
 

2008 albums
Blue Sky Black Death albums
Babygrande Records albums